Adenophostin A is a potent inositol trisphosphate (IP3) receptor agonist, but is much more potent than IP3.

IP3R is a ligand-gated intracellular Ca2+ release channel that plays a central role in modulating cytoplasmic free Ca2+ concentration (Ca2+i).  Adenophostin A is structurally different from IP3 but could elicit distinct calcium signals in cells.

References

Purines
Organophosphates
Signal transduction